Black and Brown: African Americans and the Mexican Revolution, 1910-1920 is a book by Gerald Horne, published in 2005 by NYU Press.

About
Black and Brown explores the lives and experiences of African Americans living in the southern United States borderlands with Mexico during the Mexican Revolution from 1910 to 1920, how the revolution affected them, and how they impacted the revolution.

Horne's account sheds light on the political climate that made the Mexican border as a relatively safe location for African Americans before it became dangerous during the revolutionary period. He examines the role of African Americans in fighting against indigenous people, the relationship between African Americans and immigrants, and the concerns of the U.S. government regarding African American loyalty. He also explores the heavy reliance of the U.S. on African American soldiers along the border and how this resulted in a struggle between white supremacy and national security.

The book is arranged chronologically into chapters, each looking at a different and progressive aspect of African American life along the border.

Reviews

Citation

About the author
 
Gerald Horne is Moores Professor of History and African American Studies at the University of Houston.

See also
 Becoming Mexican American: Ethnicity, Culture, and Identity in Chicano Los Angeles, 1900-1945
 Cannery Women, Cannery Lives: Mexican Women, Unionization, and the California Food Processing Industry, 1930-1950

References

Notes

Citations

External links
 Book page at NYU Press

Books about African-American history
History books about Mexico